Helcystogramma claripunctella is a moth in the family Gelechiidae. It was described by Ponomarenko in 1998. It is found in the Russian Far East (Primorsky Krai, Kuril Islands).

The wingspan is 14–15 mm. The forewings are brownish-yellow, with dark greyish-brown dots and seven to eight concolorous dots along the apex and termen. The hindwings are grey, with brown scales at the apex and along the external margin.

References

Moths described in 1998
claripunctella
Moths of Asia